Timaea (d. after 401 BC), was a Spartan queen, married to king Agis II of Sparta. 

She is known for her alleged love affair with Alcibiades, with whom she had her son Leotychides of Sparta, whose paternity from Agis she made no attempt to hide, which was reportedly the reason as to why Leotychidas was not allowed to succeed Agis II but replaced by his uncle Agesilaus II.

Issue

 Leotychides of Sparta

References

5th-century BC Greek women
Ancient Spartan queens consort
5th-century BC Spartans